Pedro Álvarez de Toledo may refer to:

 Pedro Álvarez de Toledo, 2nd Marquis of Villafranca (1484–1553), Spanish Viceroy of Naples
 Pedro Álvarez de Toledo, 5th Marquis of Villafranca (1546–1627)
 Pedro Álvarez de Toledo y Leiva (c. 1585–1654)
 Pedro de Alcántara Álvarez de Toledo y Silva, 12th Duke of the Infantado (1729–1790)
 Pedro de Alcántara Álvarez de Toledo, 13th Duke of the Infantado (1768–1841) 
 Pedro de Alcántara Álvarez de Toledo, 17th Duke of Medina Sidonia (1803–1867)